Diadegma antennaellae is a wasp first described by Walley in 1932. No subspecies are listed.

References

antennaellae
Insects described in 1932